Tulo is a woreda (administrative division) of Ethiopia.

Tulo or TULO may also refer to:

 nickname of Troy Tulowitzki (born 1984), American Major League Baseball player
 Manueli Tulo (born 1990), Fijian weightlifter
 Tulo, former name of Milagrosa, Calamba, Philippines, a neighbourhood of the city of Calamba
 Trade Union and Labour Party Liaison Organisation (TULO), a labour organisation in the United Kingdom